Imre Forgács (9 April 1949 – 26 October 2022) was a Hungarian politician and jurist, who served as Minister of Justice and Law Enforcement between 2009 and 2010.

Publications
 Neokonzervatív fordulat az Egyesült Államokban (1987)
 Az Európai Unió intézményi szemmel (1998)
 Európaizálódik-e a közigazgatás? (2008)
 Mégsem éjjeliőr? Az európai kormányzás esélyei és a pénzügyi válság (2009)

References

 Hermann, Péter: Ki kicsoda 2002 CD-ROM, Biográf Kiadó 
 Forgács Imre életrajza – Hirado.hu, 09-12-2009
 Forgács Imre lett Draskovics utódja – Origo.hu, 09-12-2009

1949 births
2022 deaths
Members of the Hungarian Socialist Workers' Party
Justice ministers of Hungary
Members of the Bajnai Government
Politicians from Budapest